Zhang Zhijun (born 1 February 1953) is a Chinese diplomat and politician. From 17 March 2013 to 21 March 2018, he has served as the Minister of the Taiwan Affairs Office of the State Council. He is currently the president of the Association for Relations Across the Taiwan Straits since April 2018.

Education 
Zhang studied at Peking University in 1971. He also went overseas to the United Kingdom for student exchange.

Taiwan Affairs Office

11th Cross-Strait Relations Symposium
In March 2013, speaking at the 11th Cross-Strait Relations Symposium in Pingtan, Fujian, Zhang called for increased quality and efficiency of cross-strait exchanges and cooperation. The symposium was attended by people from both sides, including some from Taiwan's Democratic Progressive Party. He wished to visit Taiwan as well as to meet his counterpart, Wang Yu-chi, the head of the Mainland Affairs Council.

Zhang-Wang meeting

On 11 February 2014, Zhang met with Wang Yu-chi in Nanjing, the first high-level government-to-government official contact between the two sides since the end of the Chinese Civil War in 1949. The meeting took place at the Purple Palace hotel in Nanjing. Upon meeting with Wang, both of them agreed to establish a direct and regular communication channel between the two sides for future engagement under the 1992 Consensus. They also agreed on finding a solution for health insurance coverage aiming towards Taiwanese students studying in the mainland, on pragmatically establishing SEF and ARATS offices in each other's territory and on studying the feasibility of allowing visits to detained persons once offices have been established.

Before both of them shook hands, Zhang referred to Wang as "Minister Wang Yu-chi" without mentioning the name Mainland Affairs Council and Wang referred Zhang as "TAO Director Zhang Zhijun". However, Mainland China's Xinhua News Agency referred to Wang as the "Responsible Official of Taiwan's Mainland Affairs Council" in its Chinese-language news or as the "Taiwan's Mainland Affairs Chief" in its English-language news.

On 25–28 June 2014, Zhang paid an official visit to Taiwan.

Xi-Ma meeting
Regarding the meeting between the head of both sides of the Taiwan Strait by Ma Ying-jeou and Xi Jinping, Zhang said that a meeting between family members can take place anywhere during any occasion. It needs not take place at any international or multilateral event. He further added that any such meeting can even occur in Mainland China, Taiwan or any third location. On Saturday, 7 November 2015, Xi met Ma in Singapore during Xi's state visit to Singapore.

See also
 Cross-Strait relations
 Mainland Affairs Council

References

External links 

 

1953 births
Living people
Diplomats of the People's Republic of China
People's Republic of China politicians from Jiangsu
Politicians from Nantong
Chinese Communist Party politicians from Jiangsu